Safadasht District is in Malard County, Tehran province, Iran. At the 2006 National Census, the region's population (as a part of the former Malard District of Shahriar County) was 35,456 in 8,826 households. The following census in 2011 counted 40,139 people in 10,957 households, by which time the district had been separated from the county and Malard County established. At the latest census in 2016, the district had 52,451 inhabitants in 15,458 households.

References 

Malard County

Districts of Tehran Province

Populated places in Tehran Province

Populated places in Malard County

fa:بخش صفادشت